Prototheora petrosema is a moth species of the family Prototheoridae. It is found in Western Cape and Eastern Cape provinces of South Africa. It lives in the predominantly fynbos cape vegetation of the temperate Knysna Forest. It has been found frequently around the lower slopes of Table Mountain in Cape Town.

The wingspan is 18–23 mm. Adults have been recorded from the beginning of March to mid-May.

References

Endemic moths of South Africa
Hepialoidea
Moths described in 1917
Insects of South Africa
Moths of Africa